The 1974–75 Bulgarian Cup was the 35th season of the Bulgarian Cup (in this period the tournament was named Cup of the Soviet Army). Slavia Sofia won the competition, beating Lokomotiv Sofia 3–2 in the final at the Vasil Levski National Stadium.

Preliminary round

|-
!colspan=3 style="background-color:#D0F0C0;" |1974

|}

First round

|-
!colspan=3 style="background-color:#D0F0C0;" |15/22 December 1974

|}

Group stage

Group 1
Matches were played in Septemvri, Peshtera, Panagyurishte, Pazardzhik and Velingrad

|-
!colspan=3 style="background-color:#D0F0C0;" |22 February–1 March 1975

|}

Group 2
Matches were played in Kazanlak, Nova Zagora, Chirpan and Stara Zagora

|-
!colspan=3 style="background-color:#D0F0C0;" |22 February–1 March 1975

|}

Group 3
Matches were played in Harmanli, Dimitrovgrad, Simeonovgrad and Parvomay

|-
!colspan=3 style="background-color:#D0F0C0;" |22 February–1 March 1975

|}

Group 4
Matches were played in Gotse Delchev, Simitli, Blagoevgrad and Bansko

|-
!colspan=3 style="background-color:#D0F0C0;" |22 February–1 March 1975

|}

Quarter-finals

Semi-finals

Final

Details

References

1974-75
1974–75 domestic association football cups
Cup